Seoksu Station is a station on Seoul Subway Line 1. It is situated on the border of Seoul and Anyang, the station building itself lying in Anyang, hence the address and indeed its name, which is derived from the area of Anyang in which it is located, and the platforms being in Seoul.

Vicinity
Exit 1: Siheung Distribution Market
Exit 2: Younhyun Elementary School, Younhyun Middle School, Younhyun Village

References

Seoul Metropolitan Subway stations
Metro stations in Anyang, Gyeonggi
Railway stations opened in 1982
1982 establishments in South Korea
20th-century architecture in South Korea